Euromethod is a method for managing procurement processes of Information Services. It focuses on contract management.

Euromethod consists of three books: a reference manual, a dictionary and a collection of annexes. Euromethod's first release was in 1996.

It has evolved in ISPL (Information Services Procurement Library), which has published a set of manuals.

History 

Euromethod is the result of a European project ordered and funded by DGIII (Industry) of the European Commission. It has been achieved by a consortium containing Sema Group (France), BT Group (UK), Cap-Volmac (The Netherlands), CGI (France), Datacentralen (Denmark), EMSC (Consortium of Bull-Olivetti-Siemens), Finsiel (Italy), INA (Portugal), Indra (Spain), and Softlab (Germany). The project Director was Marcel Franckson.
The reference version has been written in English. It has been translated into French, German, Italian, Spanish, Portuguese, Dutch and Danish.

Domain of Euromethod

Information SystemFranckson, M. and Verhoef, editors (1999), ‘Introduction to ISPL’, Information Services Procurement Library, ten Hagen & Stam, Den Haag, The Netherlands, Commission Centrale des Marchés et Ministère de l'Industrie, 1995, Eurométhode: un projet pour de meilleurs systèmes d'information, France, Franckson M., june 1991, 'Le Projet Eurométhode', in Normatique. 

 Information that is timely, relevant and easy to access is a cornerstone of modern organisations. The aspect of the organisation that provides, uses and distributes that information, together with the associated organisational resources such as human and technical, is called an Information System (IS). All organisations have information systems to help them manage their activities. These IS are key to the success – and often the survival – of organisations.

The dynamics of the modern world force continual change on the business activities of all types of organisations (including public administrations). Coping with this change demands ever more powerful and flexible information systems.

Acquiring an information system to meet new business needs is not a trivial task. It includes deriving the Acquisition Goal, developing a strategy for its implementation, contracting for parts of the acquisition goal, integrating the parts into the complete information system and into the business processes of the acquiring organisation.

Properly addressing these issues during acquisition significantly increases the likelihood of a successful outcome.

Managing risksFranckson, M. and Verhoef, D., editors (1999), ‘Managing Risks and Planning Deliveries’, Information Services Procurement Library, ten Hagen & Stam, Den Haag, The Netherlands,  

The evolution of technology contributes to increased opportunities but also to increased risks that have to be managed.

‘Complexity’ and ‘uncertainty’ are important factors contributing to risks in an acquisition. New technology creates new opportunities but also generates new risks.

Uncertainty will depend on the type of application, organisational aspects, technology to be used, etc. Applications that are common across organisations and are well understood present little risk. Novel and/or specific applications have the potential to provide competitive advantage but may be more risky.

Technologies are evolving rapidly and they increase the variety of possible solutions. Today's IS designers are confronted by distributed systems, graphical user interfaces, new data storage systems, integration of technical and business applications, integration of packages, multimedia, etc. In the future they may confront virtual reality and other new technologies. Such technologies create new opportunities but generate their own risks that must be managed.

An information system is increasingly perceived as a complex system, which includes human and social aspects, where technology is only one part of the whole. The highest risk potential lies in these human aspects – e.g. the migration of legacy systems has complex organisational implications that need to be taken into account.

Understanding one anotherFranckson, M. and Verhoef D., editors (1999), ‘Specifying Deliverables’, Information Services Procurement Library, ten Hagen & Stam, Den Haag, The Netherlands, Franckson M., 1994, 'The Euromethod Deliverable Model and its contribution to the objectives of Euromethod', in Methods and Associated tools for the Information System Life cycle, A.A Verrijn-Stuart and William Olle editors, IFIP,  

Effective acquisition of an information system and related services requires clear descriptions of the desired final state and the current situation. It is important that the customer and supplier have the same understanding of the current situation and the information system and related services to be achieved.

It is important to remove obstacles to the mutual understanding between customers and suppliers from different countries. These obstacles stem, in part, from the existence of a large variety of methods, each having its own concepts and vocabulary.

Customer-supplier communication becomes difficult when terminology is used which is interpreted differently by each of them.

The successful introduction of modern systems and related services demands the involvement of many people with different roles, responsibilities, functions, experiences and backgrounds. Effective communication is essential for mutual understanding.

Controlling ambitions and costs 

The costs of acquiring or enhancing an information system and keeping it in operation are often under-estimated. One important reason is the tendency for ambitions to increase during the production process, sometimes unconsciously. Controlling such ambitions requires careful management of decisions affecting investment, design, construction and installation and operation of the new or enhanced information system. The decision process needs to be planned and performed carefully and it should involve both the customer and the supplier.

Objectives of EuromethodVerhoef, D. and Van Swede, V.,(1995), 'Euromethod', Kluwer Bedrijfswetenschappen,  
Euromethod has been designed to help organisations with the acquisition of effective information systems and related services in a variety of situations. It encourages customers and suppliers to control costs and timescales, to manage risks and helps to improve mutual understanding.

The aims of Euromethod are:
 to assist mutual understanding between customers and suppliers of IS projects and services in an open international market by providing guidance underpinned by a set of concepts and a terminology to be used in their transactions
 to improve the acquisition of information systems and services by taking full account of the problem situation and associated risks
 to provide a framework for the harmonisation of methods’ terminology.

Target audience 
Euromethod is best used at a contractual level by both the customer and the supplier in order to bring its full benefits. However, even when it is started to be used by one party only, it is beneficial in terms of better planning and monitoring.

So whoever is in charge of the acquisition or the provision of an information system and related services should use Euromethod.

Senior management should enforce the use of Euromethod by their executives. This would ensure that they get the information needed to make strategic decisions and that they use the best practice available to run the acquisition efficiently.

Project and service managers should use Euromethod techniques whenever appropriate and should be familiar with Euromethod in order to appreciate and recognise the needs on the contract level.

Project and service actors should understand the Euromethod terminology to avoid misunderstandings between themselves and their managers.

Benefits from using Euromethod 
Customers of acquisitions and their suppliers can both potentially benefit from using Euromethod.

By considering the whole information system – not only software – Euromethod helps to provide solutions that fit business needs as well as organisational and technical constraints.

Euromethod as a framework 

Euromethod provides a framework within which methods, e.g. business process reengineering methods, IS development methods and project and service management methods may be described, used, improved and harmonised.

Any method may potentially be used together with Euromethod in an acquisition as long as it is suitable for the situation. Euromethod is open to structured techniques, object-oriented techniques, business process engineering techniques, IT infrastructure techniques, etc. It has been designed to be open to enhancements of these techniques in the future.

The only condition is to be familiar with Euromethod terminology. Bridging dictionaries translate the specific terminology of the method into Euromethod terminology and specify in which situation the techniques proposed by the method are suitable.

Euromethod as a method 
The acquisition takes place on three levels:
 at the service provision or project production level the actors are using a wide range of methods and tools, for tasks such as IS development, quality assurance, configuration management and computer operation
 at the service or project management level the actors are supported by project management methods and tools
 Euromethod is designed to be used at the contractual level by acquisition management – especially within contract management.

The situational approach 
Euromethod proposes different strategies to perform projects and services according to the situation. This is the so-called situational approach.
First, the situation is analysed, using situational factors that are properties of the situation which are known to determine the complexity and the uncertainty of the problem. These situational factors relate to the target domain, i.e. the organisation that is the target of the project or the service, and the project domain, i.e. the organisation in charge of performing the project or the service. Euromethod proposes a list of typical situational factors. These factors are assessed by experts and derived from interviews of people belonging to these two domains.
Then, the risks are assessed using heuristics based on the situational factors.
Finally, strategies and actions are proposed to manage the complexity and the uncertainty and to mitigate the risks.
From the strategies and actions, the acquisition plan and the delivery plans are derived.
The acquisition plan determines, among others, the various procurements and the decision points of the acquisition of projects and services.
The delivery plan describes, among others, the decision points and their sequence and the deliverables that are necessary for making these decisions. It is used to monitor the contract between customer and supplier.

References

Information technology management
Procurement